Chamber music is a form of classical music written for a small group of instruments.

Chamber music may also refer to:

Music
Chamber Music (Berio), a 1953 composition by Luciano Berio

Albums
Chambers' Music, a 1956 album by Paul Chambers
Chamber Music, a 2004 album by Blueprint
Chamber Music (Thighpaulsandra album), 2005
Chamber Music (Ballake Sissoko and Vincent Segal album), 2009
Chamber Music (Coal Chamber album), 1999
Wu-Tang Chamber Music, a 2009 album by Wu-Tang Clan

Songs
"Chamber Music", a 2011 song by Ballake Sissoko and Vincent Segal from Chamber Music
"Chamber Music", a 2009 song by Paolo Nutini from Sunny Side Up
"Chamber Music", a 2000 song by Wu-Tang Clan from The W
"Chamber Music", a 1998 song by Xzibit from 40 Dayz & 40 Nightz

Other uses
Chamber Music Journal, a periodical for chamber music
Chamber Music (film), a 1925 German film
Chamber Music (play), a 1962 play by Arthur Kopit
Chamber Music (poetry collection), a 1907 collection of poems by James Joyce

See also

List of chamber music festivals

 Music (disambiguation)
 Chamber (disambiguation)
 The Music Room (disambiguation)